World Dream is a cruise ship that most recently operated for Dream Cruises. She was initially ordered under the same name for Star Cruises. The ship was designed for the Asian cruise market and has a large number of restaurants together with a casino and specially designed cabins. She was formally named on 17 November 2017 by Cecilia Lim, wife of Genting CEO Lim Kok Thay, who became godmother of the ship.

On 16 November 2017, Dream Cruises created an  Lego model of the ship, the largest such model of a cruise ship, which is on permanent display at the Kai Tak Cruise Terminal in Hong Kong.

The ship was originally designed and ordered for Star Cruises, but she was transferred to Dream Cruises during construction.

On 1 March 2022, Dream Cruises announced its World Dream Vessel to cease operations on 2 March 2022 after its last sailing return to shores.

History

Construction and service 
World Dream was ordered in February 2014 for Star Cruises and was laid down on 29 July 2015. In November 2015, she was transferred to sister brand Dream Cruises. She was launched on 26 August 2017 and completed on 26 October 2017. World Dream entered service for Dream Cruises in November 2017.

Following the collapse of parent company Genting Hong Kong and subsequently Dream Cruises, World Dream has been laid up in Singapore since March 2022, and is set to be sold at auction with sealed bids due by 21 December 2022.  As for the rest of the fleet, World Dream's sister ship, Genting Dream has been charted out to Resorts World Cruises. Explorer Dream awaits its fate, from the creditors that own the vessel and Global Dream was sold to Disney Cruise Line. 

In 2023, the ship was sold to Cruise Saudi and renamed Manara.

Coronavirus quarantine 

Three passengers aboard World Dream during 19–24 January 2020 were confirmed to have been infected by COVID-19. On 5 February 2020, all 3,800 World Dream passengers and crew were put under quarantine on board the ship at Hong Kong's Kai Tak Cruise Terminal after Taiwan blocked its port of call in Kaohsiung. , checks of those on board were ongoing.

The quarantine was lifted on 9 February 2020 after all 1,800 crew members were tested negative of the virus. The majority of the passengers were not tested as they had had no contact with the infected Chinese passengers who had been on the ship during 19–24 January. On 26 February the Indonesian Government evacuated their 188 citizens from World Dream using the hospital ship KRI dr. Soeharso. All Indonesians that were aboard the cruise ship were taken to Sebaru Kecil Island which is part of the Thousand Islands Regency in Jakarta. After that, they underwent 14 days of quarantine and observation.

References

External links

 World Dream cruise ship's page at Dream Cruises

2017 ships
Ships of the Dream Cruises
Cruise ships involved in the COVID-19 pandemic